This article is about the particular significance of the year 1848 to Wales and its people.

Incumbents

Lord Lieutenant of Anglesey – Henry Paget, 1st Marquess of Anglesey 
Lord Lieutenant of Brecknockshire – John Lloyd Vaughan Watkins
Lord Lieutenant of Caernarvonshire – Peter Drummond-Burrell, 22nd Baron Willoughby de Eresby 
Lord Lieutenant of Cardiganshire – William Edward Powell
Lord Lieutenant of Carmarthenshire – George Rice, 3rd Baron Dynevor 
Lord Lieutenant of Denbighshire – Robert Myddelton Biddulph   
Lord Lieutenant of Flintshire – Sir Stephen Glynne, 9th Baronet
Lord Lieutenant of Glamorgan – John Crichton-Stuart, 2nd Marquess of Bute (until 18 March); Christopher Rice Mansel Talbot (from 4 May)
Lord Lieutenant of Merionethshire – Edward Lloyd-Mostyn, 2nd Baron Mostyn
Lord Lieutenant of Monmouthshire – Capel Hanbury Leigh
Lord Lieutenant of Montgomeryshire – Edward Herbert, 2nd Earl of Powis (until 17 January); Charles Hanbury-Tracy, 1st Baron Sudeley (from 26 February)
Lord Lieutenant of Pembrokeshire – Sir John Owen, 1st Baronet
Lord Lieutenant of Radnorshire – John Walsh, 1st Baron Ormathwaite

Bishop of Bangor – Christopher Bethell 
Bishop of Llandaff – Edward Copleston 
Bishop of St Asaph – Thomas Vowler Short 
Bishop of St Davids – Connop Thirlwall

Events
1 March – Llandovery College opens in the building known as the "Depot".
1 May – Opening for Chester and Holyhead Railway traffic of the first tube of Robert Stephenson's Conwy Railway Bridge.
1 August – Opening of an isolated section of the Chester and Holyhead Railway across Anglesey from Llanfair to Holyhead.
24 August – The American barque Ocean Monarch, loaded with would-be immigrants, catches fire off Colwyn Bay, with the loss of 178 lives.
24 October – Trinity College, Carmarthen is established (as the South Wales and Monmouthshire Training College), to train teachers for the Church of England.
14 November – Opening of the North Wales County Pauper Lunatic Asylum (North Wales Hospital), Denbigh.
Merthyr Tydfil Hebrew Congregation formed.
Butchers' Market in Wrexham opened.
Michael D. Jones becomes a minister in Cincinnati, Ohio.

Arts and literature

New books
John Hughes - The Self-Searcher
John Jenkins - National Education
Richard Williams Morgan - Maynooth and St. Asaph
Edward Parry - Railway Companion from Chester to Holyhead

Music
Robert Herbert Williams - Alawydd Trefriw

Visual arts
John Evan Thomas - Death of Tewdric Mawr, King of Gwent (sculpture)

Births
23 January – Daniel James, bardic poet and lyricist of Calon Lân (died 1920)
12 February – Beriah Gwynfe Evans, journalist and dramatist (died 1927)
18 September – Robert Harris, painter (died 1919)
5 October – Sir John Purser Griffiths, civil engineer (died 1938)
2 November – A. G. Edwards, first Archbishop of Wales (died 1917)
30 December – David Jenkins, composer (died 1915)
Charles Ashton police officer, literary historian and bibliophile (suicide 1899)

Deaths
17 January – Edward Herbert, 2nd Earl of Powis, 63 (accidentally shot by his son)
23 February – Lord Granville Somerset, MP for Monmouthshire, 55
18 March – John Crichton-Stuart, 2nd Marquess of Bute, creator of modern Cardiff, 54
27 March – William Ellis Jones, poet, 52
2 April – Sir Samuel Rush Meyrick, antiquary, 64
7 November – Thomas Price (Carnhuanawc), poet and historian, 61
15 November – David Hiram Williams, geologist and surveyor, 36
23 December – James Cowles Prichard, physician and ethnologist of Welsh parentage, 62

References

Wales